Vezdaea is a genus of crustose lichens in the monotypic family Vezdaeaceae, which itself is the only taxon in the order Vezdaeales. The genus was circumscribed by Elisabeth Tschermak-Woess and Josef Poelt in 1976. The genus name honours Czech lichenologist Antonín Vězda (1920-2008).

Species
Vezdaea acicularis 
Vezdaea aestivalis 
Vezdaea cobria 
Vezdaea dawsoniae 
Vezdaea flava 
Vezdaea foliicola 
Vezdaea leprosa 
Vezdaea obscura 
Vezdaea poeltiana 
Vezdaea polyspora 
Vezdaea retigera 
Vezdaea rheocarpa 
Vezdaea schuyleriana 
Vezdaea stipitata

References

Pezizomycotina
Lichen genera
Taxa described in 1976
Ascomycota genera
Taxa named by Josef Poelt